Clementina's Cactus is a 1982 children's picture book by American author and illustrator Ezra Jack Keats, his last children's book before his death the next year.

In Clementina's Cactus, Keats conveys a story without words. Clementina and her father encounter a single cactus while walking through the desert. Clementina investigates the dried, stumpy cactus until a thunderstorm sends them home.  They return the next day to find a wonderful surprise!

References

Books by Ezra Jack Keats
American picture books
1982 children's books